South Muskham is a village and civil parish in Nottinghamshire, England, close to the border with Lincolnshire. The parish includes the hamlet of Little Carlton. The population of the parish was 494 in the 2011 census.

The village lies on the historic route of the A1 Great North Road. When the Newark Bypass was built in 1964, the old Great North Road through the village became the A6065.  In 1989 the road south of the village became part of the A616, and the road through the village became the B6325. South of the village the old Great North Road passes over a causeway built in 1770 by John Smeaton, and then crosses the River Trent at Muskham Bridge.

St Wilfrid's Church is a Grade I listed building.  Parts of the church date back to the 13th century.

See also
 North Muskham

References

External links 

Villages in Nottinghamshire
Civil parishes in Nottinghamshire
Newark and Sherwood